Jesús Castellano (born 22 March 2004) is a Venezuelan professional footballer who plays as a midfielder for FC Cincinnati 2 in MLS Next Pro.

Career

Yaracuyanos
Born in Barcelona, Venezuela,  Castellano  began his career in the youth ranks of Monagas. He moved to Yaracuyanos in 2021, and made his professional debut on 8 May of that year, starting in a 1–0 loss to Gran Valencia.

New York Red Bulls
On 20 January 2022, Castellano signed with Major League Soccer club New York Red Bulls. Castellano made his debut for the Red Bulls first team on May 10, 2022, being substituted for Luquinhas during a 3-0 victory over D.C. United in the round of 32 of the 2022 U.S. Open Cup. Castellano was sent on loan to New York Red Bulls II during the 2022 season. On 31 August 2022, he scored his first professional goal for New York Red Bulls II in a 3-3 draw versus Hartford Athletic. Following the 2022 season, his contract option was declined by New York.

International career
Castellano made his debut for the Venezuela national under-16 football team on May 17, 2019, starting in a 4-0 loss to the United States national under-16 football team. Castellano made his debut for the Venezuela national under-23 football team on June 5, 2022, starting in a 1-1 draw against the Ghana national under-20 football team.

Career statistics

References

External links 

2004 births
Living people
Venezuelan footballers
Venezuelan expatriate footballers
Venezuelan expatriate sportspeople in the United States
New York Red Bulls players
Association football midfielders
Venezuela youth international footballers
New York Red Bulls II players
USL Championship players
People from Barcelona, Venezuela
21st-century Venezuelan people